Berry Hill is a historic home located near Orange, Orange County, Virginia. It was built in 1827, and is a -story, brick dwelling with a standing-seam metal gable roof. It consists of an arcaded pavilion in the main section with a west wing. It was built by William B. Philips a master mason employed by Thomas Jefferson during the construction of the University of Virginia.

It was listed on the National Register of Historic Places in 1980.

References

Houses on the National Register of Historic Places in Virginia
Houses completed in 1827
Houses in Orange County, Virginia
National Register of Historic Places in Orange County, Virginia
1827 establishments in Virginia